Fred Meyer is an American chain of hypermarket superstores founded in 1922 in Portland, Oregon, USA, by Fred G. Meyer. The stores are found in the northwest U.S., within the states of Oregon, Washington, Idaho, and Alaska. The company merged with Kroger in 1998, though the stores are still branded Fred Meyer. The chain was one of the first in the United States to promote one-stop shopping, eventually combining a complete grocery supermarket with a drugstore, bank, clothing, jewelry, home decor, home improvement, garden, electronics, restaurant, shoes, sporting goods and toys. The Fred Meyer division is headquartered in Portland.

History

1920s–1950s: beginnings

In 1922, the first Fred Meyer store opened in Portland at the corner of SW 5th & Yamhill. The store combined separate shops under one roof such as meat, produce, cheese, and other merchandise. Mr. Meyer’s vision was to give customers more reasons to shop in his store than in any other. 

The first suburban one-stop shopping center opened in 1931 in the Hollywood District of Portland, a neighborhood he deliberately chose through an application of market research: he would pay customers' overtime parking tickets that they incurred while shopping at his downtown store, just to obtain their home addresses. The store's innovations included a grocery store alongside a drugstore plus home products, off-street parking, gas station, and eventually, clothing. Fred G. Meyer would base store locations on planned highway construction.

In 1951, the Fred Meyer Company built a large warehouse near Providence Portland Medical Center in Laurelhurst, despite complaints and controversy from neighbors and the city council. Neighbors did not want large truck volume in their city, but the area was already zoned for industrial and commercial east of 44th Avenue. The huge warehouse was built to the detriment of the Banfield Expressway, built in Sullivan's Gulch less than five years later. The warehouse had to be condemned and partially destroyed for the freeway, with the state highway commission selling the remaining sections to the Bemis Company. The Fred Meyer Company moved to Swan Island on land formerly occupied by wartime housing for Kaiser Shipyards.

1960s–1970s: first acquisitions and founder's death

In the 1960s, Fred Meyer entered the Seattle market by acquiring Seattle-based Marketime Drugs. Fred Meyer also acquired a Spokane-based grocery wholesaler, The Roundup Company. Roundup owned no stores in Spokane but owned Kalispell, Montana-based B&B stores in northwest Montana and Consumer Warehouse Foods in Soap Lake, Washington.

By March 1968, Fred Meyer, Inc., was operating in four states Oregon, Washington, Idaho, and Montana and had 48 retail stores. Later in 1968, the first full-fledged Fred Meyer in the Seattle area opened, in Lynnwood, Washington. It was the largest Fred Meyer for about a decade. 

In 1973, Fred Meyer acquired all five Oregon stores of the Valu-Mart discount chain (formerly known as Villa-Mart in Oregon) from its parent company, Seattle-based Weisfield's, Inc. The following year, Weisfield's leased its remaining stores (renamed "Leslie's"), in 1975. According to an article published in the business section of The Seattle Times on August 10, 1975, Fred Meyer signed long-term leases with most of the 21 Weisfield's-owned stores (Tacoma and Everett locations were not acquired). Some of the properties may have been purchased by Fred Meyer at the time in the Oregon market but Weisfield's maintained existing leases on properties in the Seattle/Tacoma market since leases for the grocery sections (leased to Associated Grocers in 1973) and other smaller businesses within the stores were kept. Kroger acquired these properties from Weisfield during the 1990s and 2000s. Some of these properties such as the Greenwood and Midway locations were demolished to rebuild the locations. In 1975, Fred Meyer opened its first stores in Alaska as a result of acquiring Leslie's/Valu-Mart and changed the Leslie's/Valu-Mart stores to the Fred Meyer banner. As Fred Meyer became better known in the Seattle area, the Marketime Drug chain became known as Fred Meyer-Marketime. While Fred Meyer was building new stores in Washington state some smaller discount stores in the state would lease a portion of their stores to Fred Meyer as well such as The Hi-Ho Shopping Center in Puyallup and the Yard Birds Shopping Center in Centralia.

In January 1976, as part of a pressure campaign to support the eight-lane design of I-205, businessman Fred G. Meyer announced plans to build a Fred Meyer store and motel in the Gateway area.

In 1977, Marketime was renamed Fred Meyer. In the mid-1980s, the northwest Montana B&B stores also acquired the Fred Meyer name.

On September 2, 1978, Fred G. Meyer died at the age of 92. Until his death, Mr. Meyer continued to play an active role in the day-to-day operation of his company. Also in 1978, Fortune placed Fred Meyer as the 45th largest retail company by sales. The chain had over $1 billion in sales in 1979.

1980s–1990s: additional expansion and California retreat

In 1981, the company was purchased by Kohlberg Kravis Roberts in what was one of KKR's first major leveraged buyouts. As of May 1988, the chain had 99 stores in six states.

In 1984, Fred Meyer acquired Grand Central of Salt Lake City, Utah. The Grand Central stores in Utah and Idaho were converted to Fred Meyer stores, although most did not receive full supermarket departments until the mid-1990s.

In the 1990s Fred Meyer expanded into California by opening a store in Chico. Plans had been made to open a store in Redding and expand into Sacramento with several sites having been acquired. Eventually, the Chico location was closed and sold, and the Sacramento sites sold; the Redding site eventually became a Wal-Mart store in 1996.

In 1997, Fred Meyer acquired Smith's Food and Drug of Salt Lake City, though both companies maintained separate operations. The same year, Fred Meyer acquired Ralphs of Los Angeles, California, and QFC of Seattle. Both acquisitions also maintained separate operations with Fred Meyer as the holding company. In that fast string of mergers, Fred Meyer quickly became the nation's fifth largest food and drug store operator.

In 1997, Fred Meyer converted its Columbia Falls and Kalispell stores into Smith's Food & Drug Stores and closed its Polson location. In 2001, the Kalispell store was demolished and replaced with a newer Smiths location adjacent to the older, obsolete store. The Columbia Falls store retained the Fred Meyer decor (with Smith's logos over the old Fred Meyer logos) but only contained a grocery department, with none of the other departments or product offerings.

In 1998, Fred Meyer merged with Kroger of Cincinnati, Ohio. Before the company's merger, it traded on the New York Stock Exchange under the ticker symbol FMY.

2000s–2010s: Fred Meyer as a Kroger subsidiary
In 2000, the Arizona Fred Meyer stores, all of which were formerly Smith's stores that Fred Meyer acquired in the Smith's merger, were re-branded as Fry's Marketplace.

In 2004, Smith's Food and Drug assumed the operations of the Utah Fred Meyer stores, which were re-branded as Smith's Marketplace. Also, since the acquisition of the Fred Meyer Company, Kroger has been unifying standards across the company, adopting many of the Fred Meyer store standards, and implementing their own standards to the Fred Meyer stores. Kroger and Fred Meyer stores are slowly becoming more similar in management and merchandising.

Additionally, one Fred Meyer in Seattle in the Capitol Hill neighborhood merged its operations with QFC which had a grocery store across the street from the Broadway Market. This particular Fred Meyer, probably the smallest one in the chain, had only personal care and home health items, along with general merchandise, but no food or apparel. This store is now a QFC Marketplace, the only one of its kind, but it is not signed as such.

On March 16, 2018, Fred Meyer notified that it had decided to stop selling guns and ammunition to people under the age of 21.

Private label brands
Fred Meyer employs Kroger's manufacturing by adding its own private label brands alongside national brand products. Aside from products labeled Kroger or Fred Meyer, one might also find the following brands at a Fred Meyer store: Kivu Coffee (locally roasted in Portland, OR & Seattle, WA), Country Oven, Everyday Living (and the more upscale eL²), F•M•V ("For Maximum Value") is now Kroger value, Moto Tech, Private Selection, HD Designs, Dip, Kidz Korner, Splash Spa, Simple Truth, Psst, Homesense, and Naturally Preferred. Former brands associated with Fred Meyer were My-Te-Fine, President's Choice, Fred Bear, F. G. Meyer First Choice, Personal Choice, and Perfect Choice.

In 2018, Fred Meyer stores used Geoffrey's Toy Box name for toy departments in the Christmas season.

Rewards program
On May 4, 2004, Fred Meyer introduced Fred Meyer Rewards, a program that rewards customers for shopping in their stores. To participate, a customer completes a registration form and receives three purple cards (a credit card-sized card and two key tags). When the program was introduced, participating customers received one point for every $5 they spent in a single transaction (transactions totaling under $5 did not receive a point). If a customer earned 100 points (spending at least $500) during a 13-week rewards cycle, they would receive about $5 in rebate vouchers. The rewards mailer also typically included percentage discount coupons on specific items.

On April 29, 2007, the company revised the program somewhat, simultaneously with the launch of their Fred Meyer Rewards MasterCard. Effective on that date (which was the beginning of a 13-week cycle), customers receive a point for each dollar spent, but the value of each point decreased proportionally, and a customer must earn 500 points in a 13-week rewards cycle to receive a rebate voucher. Customers who use the MasterCard version of Rewards earn double points at Fred Meyer (2 points per dollar spent), and single points everywhere else where MasterCard is accepted (1 point per dollar spent).

In 2011, the company switched from MasterCard to Visa, which uses the same points format as the MasterCard program. In addition to reward points, Visa rewards cardholders receive 15 cents off fuel per 100 fuel points.

In August 2020, Fred Meyer revised the program to match other Kroger divisions. The card is now required to purchase items in the store at sale prices.

Plastic bag ban
In July 2010, Fred Meyer announced that effective August 1, it would no longer offer plastic bags at any of its 10 Portland stores, due to their negative environmental impacts. Until the City of Portland banned the use of plastic bags in grocery and certain big box stores in October 2011, Fred Meyer was the largest retail chain in the Portland metropolitan area to adopt such a policy. A spokesperson indicated that an increasing number of the chain's customers have been choosing to use reusable bags, noting that Fred Meyer's own sales of such bags at its check stands had increased 30 percent from 2008 to 2009. During the COVID-19 pandemic, baggers were still able to bag with paper bags, but customers with reusable bags were advised they would have to bag on their own.

Gun and ammunition policy
In March 2018, Fred Meyer announced it would cease the sale of all firearms and ammunition to people under the age of 21, as a response to the Stoneman Douglas High School shooting. Later that month, it was announced that the ban would be extended to sales of firearms in general. Additionally, the company will stop selling magazines that feature "assault rifles," although the company did not specify how it would screen publications.

References

External links

 Fred Meyer Stores

Companies based in Portland, Oregon
Retail companies established in 1922
Economy of the Northwestern United States
Hypermarkets of the United States
Kohlberg Kravis Roberts companies
Kroger
Supermarkets of the United States
1931 establishments in Oregon
1981 mergers and acquisitions
1998 mergers and acquisitions
Culture of the Pacific Northwest